The 2018 season was KA's second season back in top tier football in Iceland following their relegation in 2004. This was their 17th season in the top flight of Icelandic football. KA finished the previous season in 7th place.

Squad 

(captain)

Out on loan

Transfers

Winter 

In:

Out:

Summer 

In:

Out:

Competitions

Table

References

External links 
   

Knattspyrnufélag Akureyrar
Knattspyrnufélag Akureyrar seasons
Icelandic football club seasons
Knat